Epsom Playhouse is the main theatre in Epsom and Ewell, Surrey, England.

Performances
This 406-seat theatre hosts internationally travelling casts and comedy acts as part of their tours and amateur productions.

Annual events
The theatre hosts a summer film series. 
A Pre-Christmas and in the Twelve Days of Christmas: children's pantomime, such as Peter Pan, Snow White etc.

Seasonal tours and productions
To date the theatre has hosted opera, dance, drama and comedy as its main acts.

In January 2009 the Playhouse celebrated its 25th anniversary with a specially commissioned production of Smokey Joe's Cafe.

Location
The Playhouse (as it is locally referred to) is in the south-western end of Epsom town centre, adjoining the Ashley Shopping Centre and car park. It was built as part of the Ashley Centre development in the early 1980s, opening in 1984. It is currently managed by Epsom and Ewell Borough Council.

Amenities 
Main auditorium, seating 406 people
The Myers studio theatre
This seats up to 80 people and is used for jazz events, children's shows and community events
Public bar and bistro, and a small private bar for hire
Box office, toilets and reception areas.

See also

References

External links
 Official website

Theatres in Surrey
Epsom